The Harlem Yard is a CTA rail yard Forest Park, Illinois which stores cars for the Green Line of the Chicago Transit Authority. Currently, 5000-series railcars are stored here. It is adjacent to Harlem/Lake station.

References 

Chicago Transit Authority
Forest Park, Illinois